Jacob Kettler (Latvian: Hercogs Jēkabs Ketlers; 28 October 1610 – 1 January 1682) was one of the greatest Baltic German Dukes of the Duchy of Courland and Semigallia (1642–1682). Under his ambitious and competent rule, the Courland and Semigallia became more independent on its Polish suzerain, reached its peak in wealth and even engaged in its own overseas colonization putting part of (present) Latvia on the worlds map as one of the smallest, but fastest growing states in the world at that time. 

Yet, in the end the results of his rule failed in the confrontation with much stronger powers both directly in the Baltic (Sweden) and overseas too (Dutch). A ruler "too rich and powerful to be a duke but too small and poor to be a king" could not, with his small ancestral territory and very limited resources, play the powerful role he sought in European politics of that time.

Early life 
Kettler was born in Goldingen (now known as Kuldīga). He was the son of Wilhelm Kettler and Princess Sophia of Prussia, a daughter of Albert Frederick, Duke of Prussia, and was a godson of King James I of England. While his father was exiled from the duchy, Jacob lived in the courts of Stettin and Berlin. He studied in Rostock and at the University of Leipzig and sympathized with the ideas of mercantilism. 

In 1633, he led a Curonian regiment in the Smolensk War between the Polish–Lithuanian Commonwealth and Russia. In 1634, he made a grand tour of Europe, visiting Paris, London, and Amsterdam, where he studied shipbuilding. In 1638, he became co-ruler of the duchy and in 1642 sole Duke of Courland.

Reign 

Under Kettler's rule, the duchy traded with the Netherlands, Portugal, England, France, and other nations. He started large scale reforms of the duchy's economy, improved its agriculture, opened many manufactures and started a shipbuilding industry. He founded the Fleet of Courland and Semigalla, a navy and merchant fleet. During his reign, the duchy became de facto independent of the Polish crown, because all contracts with foreign powers were signed as between independent states. After 1646, all customs administration of the duchy also was in the duke's power.

The duchy was involved in colonisation. In 1651 Jacob sent a fleet to build Fort Jacob on the Gambia River, on an island that would later be known as St. Andrews. In 1654, he conquered Tobago with forces from the Das Wappen der Herzogin von Kurland, a double-decker ship armed with 45 cannons, carrying 25 officers, 124 Courlander soldiers, and eighty families of Latvian colonists. The colony on Tobago was named Neu Kurland ('New Courland' in German). In 1654, Duke Jacob was a party to the Treaty of Westminster.

Imprisonment 
The duke was taken prisoner by the Swedes from 1658 to 1660, during the Northern Wars. Together with his family, he was held captive in Riga and later in Ivangorod. During this time, his colonies were attacked and lost and his fleet destroyed. After the war ended, he rebuilt the duchy's fleet and retook the island of Tobago from the Dutch. Some believe he also intended to colonize Australia, which had at that time been discovered and claimed by the Dutch, with whom he was at war. He supposedly had the blessing of Pope Innocent X.

However, the pope soon died, and the new pope was unwilling to support the plan. For the rest of his reign he tried to reach a pre-war level of wealth but managed to do this only partly. 

The duke died in Mitau (Jelgava) on 1 January 1682.

Legacy 

Kettler is remembered as a fair ruler who gave opportunities to the local Latvian peasants and even knew the Latvian language.

Marriage and issue 

Kettler married Margravine Louise Charlotte of Brandenburg (1617–1676), the daughter of George William, Elector of Brandenburg and had issue:

Ancestry

See also 
 Polish–Lithuanian Commonwealth

References

External links 

 
 
  Coinage of Jacob Kettler

1610 births
1682 deaths
Baltic-German people
People from Kuldīga
Dukes of Courland
17th-century Latvian people
Burials in the Ducal Crypt of the Jelgava Palace